The 1953 Isle of Thanet by-election was held on 12 March 1953.  It was held due to the resignation of the incumbent Conservative MP, Hon. Edward Carson.  It was retained by the Conservative candidate, William Rees-Davies.

References

By-elections to the Parliament of the United Kingdom in Kent constituencies
1953 elections in the United Kingdom
1953 in England
1950s in Kent